Johannes Skar (18 November 1837 – 3 February 1914) was a Norwegian educator and folklorist.

Biography
Skar  was born at  Øyer in Oppland, Norway. He was the son of Ole Torsteinsson Skar (1802-1886) and Mari Johannesdotter Lånke (1814-1894). His brother was  educator Matias Skard (1846–1927).

 
He was raised in the traditional region of  Gudbrandsdalen and attended the  Latin School in Lillehammer (Lillehammer latinskole). He later studied at the University of Christiania where he took his degree in 1860. As an educator, he first worked as a  children's tutor. From 1883 to 1892, he taught at Bruuns Folk School (Bruuns folkehøgskule) in Sel and Gausdal. The school  was operated by his brother-in-law, folk school pioneer Christopher Bruun (1839-1920).
 
Skar collected folklore throughout his adult life. These works includes legends, fairy tales, proverbs, riddles, nursery rhymes and songs.
In 1881, on the initiative of Jørgen Moe (1813-1882) and Jørgen Løvland (1848-1922), he received a private grant from citizens in Kristiansand to continue his for his collection efforts. The following year he received a scholarship from the university at Christiania. In 1897 at age  59, he was granted a state scholarship which provided financial support for the remainder of his life. He then moved back to Setesdal.

In 1876, he published a book which  contains information about life and folklore in Gudbrandsdalen. Olaf Norli (1861-1959) was the publisher for the main body of his work. His main contribution to Norwegian literature is the work Gamalt or Sætesdal (1903-1916), a collection of eight volumes of the old peasant culture in the valley of Setesdal. These are works of cultural history with a prominent portion about the older folk culture in Setesdal built on the valley's  pastoral past. Two volumes were published after his death.

He died at Bygland in Aust-Agder  during 1914. He was buried in the cemetery of Årdal Church at Grendi in Bygland. 
A bust of Johannes Skar was designed by  sculptor  Dyre Vaa (1903–1980) and cast in bronze. It  was erected in the churchyard of Årdal Church  in 1924.

References

Other sources
 Olav Bø (1953) Johannes Skar, Gudbrandsdølen som skapte Gamalt or Saetesdal (Oslo: Olaf Norli)

1837 births
1914 deaths
People from Øyer
Norwegian folklorists